The Imperial River is a river in southwest Florida in the United States. It was originally named Surveyors Creek before the city was developed. The river is part of The Great Calusa Blueway.

On the east side of the Tamiami Trail (U.S. Route 41) bridge, the Imperial River Boat Ramp provides boaters and kayakers with a place to launch their vessels. There is also a small fishing pier onsite. Riverside Park in the downtown area provides river access and a bandshell for community events and concerts.

See also
List of Florida rivers

References

Rivers of Lee County, Florida
Rivers of Florida